Arduino may refer to:

Arduino (name), list of people with this given name and surname
Arduino, the micro-controller platform
Dorsum Arduino, a wrinkle ridge on the Moon